The following is a list of notable deaths in November 1999.

Entries for each day are listed alphabetically by surname. A typical entry lists information in the following sequence:
 Name, age, country of citizenship at birth, subsequent country of citizenship (if applicable), reason for notability, cause of death (if known), and reference.

November 1999

1
Minoru Chiaki, 82, Japanese actor.
Jean Coutu, 74, Canadian actor.
Edmund Dell, 78, British politician and businessman.
Bhekimpi Dlamini, 74, Southern African politician, Prime Minister of Swaziland (1983-1986).
Theodore Hall, 74, American physicist and spy for the Soviet Union, renal cancer.
Thomas H. Jukes, 93, British-American biologist.
Walter Payton, 45, American gridiron football player, cholangiocarcinoma.
Héctor Pellegrini, 68, Argentine film actor.
Franca Scagnetti, 75, Italian film actress.
John Sears, 63, American NASCAR racing driver.
William Sheldon, 92, Irish politician and farmer.

2
Jackie Davis, 78, American soul jazz singer, organist and bandleader, stroke.
Demetrio B. Lakas, 74, Panamase politician, president (1969-1978), heart disease.
Atputharajah Nadarajah, 36, Sri Lankan journalist and politician, shot.
Hans-Joachim Preil, 76, East German comedian.
Hardie Scott, 92, American politician.
Mitar Subotić, 38, Serbian-Brazilian musician and composer, fire.
William van Straubenzee, 75, British politician.
Richard Voliva, 87, American wrestler and coach.

3
Ian Bannen, 71, Scottish actor, car accident.
William J. Brown, 59, American lawyer and politician.
Alan Heusaff, 78, Breton nationalist, linguist, and journalist.
Vilen Kalyuta, 69, Soviet and Ukrainian cinematographer.
Keizo Saji, 80, Japanese businessman and art patron.

4
Daisy Bates, 84, American civil rights activist, publisher and journalist.
Alvin Coox, 75, American military historian and author.
Zvi Griliches, 69, American economist and holocaust survivor.
Ernest J. Kump, 87, American architect, author and inventor.
Malcolm Marshall, 41, West Indian cricketer, colon cancer.
Cornel Popa, 64, Romanian football player.
Maybelle Reichardt, 92, American discus thrower and Olympian.
Henri Van Kerckhove, 73, Belgian road cyclist.
Fred Wallner, 71, American gridiron football player.
Charles Wintour, 82, British newspaper editor.
Zainuddin, 47, Indian actor and comedian, respiratory complications.

5
Antonio Fraguas Fraguas, 93, Spanish historian, ethnographer, anthropologist, and geographer.
James Goldstone, 68, American film and television director.
Noureddin Kianouri, 94, Iranian architect and political leader.
Richard Marius, 66, American academic and writer, pancreatic cancer.
Colin Rowe, 79, British-American architectural historian.

6
José María Caffarel, 79, Spanish film actor.
Laurence Decore, 59, Canadian lawyer and politician, cancer.
Regina Ghazaryan, 84, Armenian painter and public figure.
George V. Higgins, 59, American author, lawyer, newspaper columnist, and raconteur, heart attack.
Rob Hoeke, 60, Dutch singer, pianist, composer and songwriter.
Anthony "Sooty" Jones, 46, American rock bassist ("Humble Pie").

7
Tom Briggs, 80, English football player.
Allan Felder, 56, American songwriter.
Joe Lang Kershaw, 88, American politician and civics teacher, congestive heart failure.
Walter McDonald, 96, Canadian politician.
Primo Nebiolo, 76, Italian sports official and IAAF president, heart attack.

8
Lester Bowie, 58, American jazz trumpet player and composer, liver cancer.
Gwen Gordy Fuqua, 71, American songwriter and composer, cancer.
Jerry Kerr, 87, Scottish football player and manager.
Yury Vasilyevich Malyshev, 58, Soviet cosmonaut.
Richard Martin, 51, American academic, curator, and art and fashion historian, melanoma.
Rob Nieuwenhuys, 91, Dutch writer.
Harry Riebauer, 78, German film and television actor.
Leon Štukelj, 100, Yugoslav gymnast and Olympic gold medalist, heart attack.

9
Herb Abramson, 82, American record producer and executive.
Marjorie Gladman, 91, American tennis player.
Huang Huoqing, 98, Chinese politician.
Mabel King, 66, American actress and singer, diabetes.
Wolf Ruvinskis, 78, Mexican actor and professional wrestler, cardiovascular disease.
Dick Todd, 85, American NFL football player and coach.

10
Stasys Antanas Bačkis, 93, Lithuanian diplomat and civil servant.
Felix Galimir, 89, Austrian-American violinist.
Robert Kramer, 60, American film director, screenwriter and actor, meningitis.
Eric Langton, 92, English motorcycle speedway rider.
Thomas McKinney, 72, Northern Irish rugby player.
Jean Potts, 88, American mystery novelist.

11
Mary Kay Bergman, 38, American voice actress (South Park), suicide by gunshot.
Frank Bowyer, 77, English footballer.
Maurice Dugowson, 61, French film director and screenwriter.
Vivian Fuchs, 91, British explorer.
Gabriel Gonsum Ganaka, 62, Nigerian Roman Catholic prelate.
Daniel Ivernel, 79, French film actor, suicide.
Choi Moo-ryong, 71, South Korean actor.
Sathyavani Muthu, 76, Indian politician.
Thomas Pitfield, 96, British composer, poet, artist, engraver, and calligrapher.
Jack Plimsoll, 82, South African cricketer.
Lodewijk Prins, 86, Dutch chess player and chess referee.
Jacobo Timerman, 76, Soviet-Argentine publisher, journalist, and author, heart attack.

12
Eulalie Minfred Banks, 104, American illustrator of children's books.
Gaby Casadesus, 98, French classical pianist and teacher.
Pituka de Foronda, 81, Spanish actress.
Sven Hjertsson, 75, Swedish football player.
Aang Kunaefi, 76, Indonesian military officer and diplomat.
Mohammad Mohammadullah, 78, Bangladeshi politician, President (1973-1975).
Konrad Petzold, 69, German film director, writer and actor.
Alfred Gwynne Vanderbilt II, 87, British-American racehorse owner and member of the Vanderbilt family.

13
John Benson Brooks, 82, American jazz pianist, songwriter, arranger, and composer.
Germaine Dieterlen, 96, French anthropologist.
Tony Rumble, 43, American professional wrestler and manager, heart attack.
John Stapp, 89, United States Army Air Forces officer, flight surgeon and physician.
Barbara Jean Wong, 75, American actress.

14
Rut Bryk, 83, Finnish ceramist.
Orazio Costa, 88, Italian theatre pedagogist and director.
Brian Ó Cuív, 83, Irish historian and Celtic scholar.
Lucile Fairbanks, 82, American actress.
Bert Jacobs, 58, Dutch football manager, cancer.
Minna Keal, 90, British composer.
Benjamin I. Schwartz, 82, American academic, author and sinologist.
György Sebők, 77, Hungarian-American pianist and academic.
Jimmy Sidle, 57, American gridiron football player, heart failure.
Harbaksh Singh, 86, Indian Army senior officer.
Peter Wildeblood, 76, Anglo-Canadian journalist, novelist, playwright and gay rights campaigner.

15
Jean-Marie Adiaffi, 58, Ivorian writer, screenwriter and filmmaker.
Sir Harry Llewellyn, 3rd Baronet, 88, British equestrian, Olympic champion (1952).
P. K. van der Byl, 76, Rhodesian politician.
Fikri Elma, 65, Turkish football player.
Lucien Jasseron, 85, French football player.
Gene Levitt, 79, American television writer, producer and director, prostate cancer.
Maynard Lyndon, 92, American architect.
Norio Taniguchi, 87, Japanese academic who coined the term  nano-technology.

16
Bill Burgoyne, 52, New Zealand rugby league player.
Harry Gibbs, 79, British boxing referee.
H. Clay Earles, 86, American NASCAR team owner.
Desmond Domnique Jennings, 28, American serial killer, execution by lethal injection.
Jay Moloney, 35, American Hollywood talent agent, suicide by hanging.
Daniel Nathans, 71, American microbiologist.

17
Leif Anderson, 74, Swedish jazz expert, journalist and radio personality.
Faubion Bowers, 82, American academic and writer.
Edmund Fryde, 76, Polish-British historian.
Cowboy Jimmy Moore, 89, American pocket billiards (pool) player.
Enrique Urkijo, 39, Spanish singer, songwriter, and guitarist, drug overdose.

18
Evgeny Belosheikin, 33, Russian ice hockey player, suicide.
Paul Bowles, 88, American migrant composer, author, and translator, heart failure.
Beatrice Colen, 51, American television and film actress, lung cancer.
Sarath Dassanayake, 57, Sri Lankan composer, film producer and a musician.
Stephen Greene, 82, American artist.
Jay Heard, 79, American baseball player.
Horst P. Horst, 93, German-American fashion photographer.
Vittorio Miele, 72, Italian painter.
Prince Heinrich of Hesse and by Rhine, 72, German noble.
Doug Sahm, 58, American musician and singer-songwriter, heart attack.
James Tinn, 77, British politician.
Gladys Yang, 80, British translator of Chinese literature.

19
Yvette Cauchois, 90, French physicist, infectious disease.
Alexander Liberman, 87, Russian-American publisher, painter, photographer, and sculptor.
Plínio Marcos, 64, Brazilian writer, actor, journalist and playwright, multiple organ dysfunction syndrome.
John McCue, 77, English footballer.
Antonis Migiakis, 88, Greek football player.
Arthur W. Saha, 76, American speculative fiction editor and anthologist, cancer.

20
Yuri Chesnokov, 47, Soviet football player.
Amintore Fanfani, 91, Italian politician and statesman, prime minister (1954, 1958-1959, 1960-1963, 1982-1983, 1987).
Ludwig Hamm, 77, German politician and member of the Bundestag.
Sadao Hasegawa, 54, Japanese graphic artist, suicide by hanging.
Arthur Hewson, 84, Australian politician.
Sufia Kamal, 88, Bangladeshi poet and political activist.
Germaine Ribière, 82, French Resistance member during World War II.

21
Alphonse Antoine, 84, French road bicycle racer.
Margaret E. Chisholm, 78, American librarian and educator.
Quentin Crisp, 90, British writer, illustrator, actor and socialite, heart attack.
Ralph Foody, 71, American actor, cancer.
Marie Kraja, 88, Albanian opera singer.
Serge Lang, 79, French journalist and skiing executive, heart attack.
Josef Lux, 43, Czech politician, pneumonia.
Horacio Gómez Bolaños prieto, 69, Mexican actor and brother of Chespirito, heart attack.
Toshio Sakai, 59, Japanese news photographer and Pulitzer Prize winner, heart attack.

22
Ibrahim Böhme, 55, East German politician and Stasi informer.
Flávio Costa, 93, Brazilian football player and manager.
Moira Dunbar, 81, Scottish-Canadian glaciologist.
Efim Etkind, 81, Soviet philologist and translation theorist.
Abdelkader Hachani, 42, Algerian Islamic leader, murdered.
Patrick Moten, 42, American songwriter and musician, cancer.

23
Oddmund Andersen, 83, Norwegian football player.
Leyla Badirbeyli, 79, Soviet and Azerbaijani actress.
Micheál Cranitch, 86, Irish Fianna Fáil politician.
Baldur Möller, 85, Icelandic chess master.
Patrick Palmer, 66, British Army officer.
Phoebe Snetsinger, 68, American birder, road traffic accident.

24
Howard Biggs, 83, American pianist, songwriter and arranger.
Joseph Farrell, 94, Irish Fianna Fáil politician.
Fernando Fernández, 83, Mexican actor, singer and director.
Sarah Gainham, 84, British novelist and journalist.
Gregor Höll, 88, Austrian skier and Olympian.
David Kessler, 93, British publisher and author.
Mario Mathieu, 82, Argentine cyclist.
Matéo Maximoff, 82, French writer and evangelical pastor.
Hilary Minster, 55, English character actor, cancer.
Christian Pedersen, 79, Danish cyclist.
Ambrose Rayappan, 98, Indian Roman Catholic archbishop.
Howie Young, 62, Canadian ice hockey player and actor.

25
Didier Anzieu, 76, French psychoanalyst and academic.
William Benedict, 82, American actor.
Oddvar Berrefjord, 81, Norwegian jurist and politician.
Pierre Bézier, 89, French engineer, CAD/CAM pioneer and namesake of Bézier curves.
Valentín Campa, 95, Mexican railway union leader and politician.
Richard M. Eakin, 89, American zoologist and professor.
T. V. Kochubava, 43, Indian writer, heart attack.
Lucile Petry Leone, 97, American nurse.
Dumisani Maraire, 54, Zimbabwean musician, stroke.
Antonio Raxel, 77, Mexican actor.
Jesse Renick, 82, American basketball player.
Ray Timgren, 71, Canadian ice hockey player.
Gordon Wren, 80, American ski jumper and Olympian.

26
Louisette Bertholle, 94, French cooking teacher and writer.
George L. Engel, 85, American internist and psychiatrist, heart failure.
Angelika Hurwicz, 77, German actress and theatre director.
Clifford Jarvis, 58, American hard bop and free jazz drummer.
John L. Kelley, 82, American mathematician.
Paul Kozlicek, 62, Austrian football player.
Ashley Montagu, 94, British-American anthropologist.
Henry Nemo, 90, American  musician, songwriter, and actor.
John Skelton, 76, British letter-cutter and sculptor.

27
Jeanne Chall, 78, American psychologist, writer, and educator, heart failure.
William Sebastian Heckscher, 94, German art historian and academic.
I-Roy, 55, Jamaican DJ, heart failure.
Hiro Matsuda, 62, Japanese-American professional wrestler and trainer, prostate cancer.
Arturo Fernández Meyzán, 93, Peruvian footballer.
Alain Peyrefitte, 74, French scholar and politician, cancer.
Robert Theobald, 70, American economist and futurist author, esophageal cancer.
Elizabeth Gray Vining, 97, American librarian, tutor and author.
Johnny Walker, 72, American blues pianist and organist.

28
Robert Bingham, 33, American writer, drugs overdose.
Dick Errickson, 87, American baseball player.
N. V. M. Gonzalez, 84, Filipino novelist, short story writer, essayist and poet.
Peter Karvaš, 79, Slovakian writer.
Bethel Leslie, 70, American actress and screenwriter, cancer.
Abdur Razzaq, Bangladeshi scholar, academic and intellectual.

29
Germán Arciniegas, 98, Colombian historian, author and journalist, pneumonia.
John Berry, 82, American film director.
Suzy Carrier, 77, French film actress.
Herbert Freudenberger, 73, German-American psychologist, kidney disease.
Kaoru Iwamoto, 97, Japanese Go player and writer.
Bill Jennings, 82, Canadian ice hockey player.
Curtis Knight, 70, American musician, cancer.
Michael O'Halloran, 66, Irish-born British politician.
Sid Patterson, 72, Australian track cyclist, liver cancer.
Gene Rayburn, 81, American radio personality and game show host, heart failure.
Kazuo Sakamaki, 81, Japanese naval officer.
Lewis Hastings Sarett, 81, American organic chemist and inventor of cortisone.

30
Carlos Hugo Christensen, 84, Argentine film director, screenwriter and film producer.
Philip Elman, 81, American lawyer at the U.S. Department of Justice.
Don Harris, 61, American blues and rock and roll violinist and guitarist, pulmonary disease.
Huang Hsin-chieh, 71, Taiwanese politician and legislator, heart attack.
Al Schroll, 67, American baseball player.
M. N. Srinivas, 83, Indian sociologist and social anthropologist.
Sam Treiman, 74, American theoretical physicist, leukemia.
Ulrich Wildgruber, 62, German actor.
Vladimir Yashchenko, 40, Soviet high jumper and world record holder, cirrhosis.

References 

1999-11
 11